Prunella grandiflora, the large-flowered selfheal, is a species of flowering plant in the family Lamiaceae. It is native to Europe and neighboring parts of West Asia.

References

External links
Prunella grandiflora

grandiflora
Plants described in 1776
Flora of Europe